William Henry Hunt (November 5, 1857 – February 4, 1949) was the governor of Puerto Rico, a United States district judge of the United States District Court for the District of Montana, Associate Judge of the United States Court of Customs Appeals and a United States Circuit Judge of the United States Customs Court, the United States Court of Appeals for the Ninth Circuit and the United States Circuit Courts for the Ninth Circuit.

Education and career

Born on November 5, 1857, in New Orleans, Louisiana, Hunt read law in 1880. He entered private practice in Fort Benton, Montana Territory from 1880 to 1887. He was Collector of Customs for the Montana Territory and Idaho Territory from 1881 to 1885. He was a delegate to the Montana Constitutional Convention in 1884. He was Attorney General of the Montana Territory from 1885 to 1887. He was a member of the Montana House of Representatives in 1889. He was a Judge of the Montana District Court for the First Judicial District from 1889 to 1894. He was a justice of the Montana Supreme Court from 1894 to 1900. He was the Secretary of Puerto Rico from 1900 to 1901. He was Governor of Puerto Rico from 1901 to 1904.

Notable orders as Governor

During his governorship, Hunt signed numerous Executive Orders, including those that made Christmas Day and Thanksgiving Day legal holidays in Puerto Rico.

Federal judicial service

Hunt was nominated by President Theodore Roosevelt on April 14, 1904, to a seat on the United States District Court for the District of Montana vacated by Judge Hiram Knowles. He was confirmed by the United States Senate on April 19, 1904, and received his commission the same day. His service terminated on March 30, 1910, due to his elevation to the United States Court of Customs Appeals.

Hunt was nominated by President William Howard Taft on March 9, 1910, to the United States Court of Customs Appeals (later the United States Court of Customs and Patent Appeals), to a new Associate Judge seat authorized by 36 Stat. 11. He was confirmed by the Senate on March 30, 1910, and received his commission the same day. His service terminated on January 31, 1911, due to his elevation to the Commerce Court and Ninth Circuit.

Hunt was nominated by President Taft on December 12, 1910, to the United States Commerce Court, the United States Court of Appeals for the Ninth Circuit and the United States Circuit Courts for the Ninth Circuit, to a new joint seat authorized by 36 Stat. 539. He was confirmed by the Senate on January 31, 1911, and received his commission on February 8, 1911. On December 31, 1911, the Circuit Courts were abolished and he thereafter served on the Commerce Court and Court of Appeals. On December 13, 1913, the Commerce Court was abolished and he thereafter served only on the Court of Appeals. He assumed senior status on January 31, 1928. His service terminated on November 30, 1928, due to his retirement.

Later career and death

Following his retirement from the federal bench, Hunt resumed private practice in San Francisco, California from 1928 to 1942. He died on February 4, 1949, in Charlottesville, Virginia.

References

Sources
 
 

|-

1857 births
1949 deaths
California Republicans
Judges of the United States Commerce Court
Judges of the United States Court of Customs and Patent Appeals
Judges of the United States Court of Appeals for the Ninth Circuit
Judges of the United States District Court for the District of Montana
Members of the Montana House of Representatives
Montana Republicans
Justices of the Montana Supreme Court
Politicians from New Orleans
Republican Party (Puerto Rico) politicians
United States court of appeals judges appointed by William Howard Taft
United States district court judges appointed by Theodore Roosevelt
20th-century American judges
United States federal judges admitted to the practice of law by reading law
People from Fort Benton, Montana